The 1934 All-Pro Team consisted of American football players chosen by various selectors for the All-Pro team of the National Football League (NFL) for the 1934 NFL season. Teams were selected by, among others, the Associated Press (AP), the United Press (UP), the Green Bay Press-Gazette (GB) based on the composite view of the coaches of 10 NFL teams and a half dozen NFL officials, Collyer's Eye (CE), and the Chicago Daily News (CDN).

Players displayed in bold were consensus first-team selections. Five players were selected as first-team All-Pro players by all five selectors: Detroit Lions quarterback Dutch Clark; Chicago Bears halfback Beattie Feathers; Chicago Bears fullback Bronko Nagurski; Chicago Bears end Bill Hewitt; and New York Giants center Mel Hein.

Team

References

All-Pro Teams
1934 National Football League season